The Qatar Stars League, or the QSL, also called QNB Stars League for sponsorship reasons, is the top level football league in Qatar football league system. Contested by 12 teams, it operates on a system of promotion and relegation with the Qatari Second Division (QSD). Seasons of the QSL usually run from September to April. The league's first season was played in 1963, although the first official season occurred in 1972. The league currently features 12 clubs, with one club being demoted to make room for one club being promoted.

The Qatari league system provides 5 domestic cups that these clubs are able to participate in: the Emir of Qatar Cup, open to all teams in both the first and second divisions, the Qatar Crown Prince Cup a postseason tournament played by the top four first division teams, the Sheikh Jassem Cup, a prelude to the first division regular season, the Qatari Stars Cup, a round-robin tournament played midseason, and the Qatar FA Cup, where the bottom 8 teams from the QSL and the entire QSD participate. The league title has been officially won by 7 clubs since its inception. The club that has won the most championships is Al Sadd SC, with 16 titles.

League structure
There are 2 divisions in the Qatari football structure and the league has previously seen one club promoted and relegated each year except in expansion seasons. The Qatar Stars League, previously known as the Q-League currently features 12 teams, with the 2nd division featuring 8 teams. The top four clubs at the end of the regular league system participate in the Qatar Crown Prince Cup, which was formed in the 1994/95 season.

The Qatar Stars League has slowly expanded since the turn of the decade moving from 9 clubs to 10 clubs, and then latest setup of 12 clubs for the Qatari League 2009-10 campaign. It was announced that in the 2013-14 season, the number of clubs in the top division would increase to 14, whereas the second division would increase to 18 clubs which includes the reserve teams of the top division clubs.

It was announced on 15 April 2009 that no clubs would be relegated from the top flight in the 2008–09 Qatar Stars League season, due to expansion reasons, however the announcement was made with only one game remaining. That year, the top league expanded to 12 clubs. In May 2013, the QFA again expanded the league by two more teams, bringing the total number of clubs in the first division to 14. In 2017 the number of teams moved back to 12.

There are currently 4 official amateur football leagues in Qatar. Three amateur leagues are under the jurisdiction of the Qatar Community Football League (QCFL), established by the Supreme Committee for Delivery & Legacy, and the fourth, known as the Qatar Amateur League (QAL) is recognized by the QFA. Inaugurated in November 2013, the QAL has 14 teams, all of which were established through the country's government, political and social sectors.

History

Early history 
The first unofficial season of the Qatar Stars League was the 1963–64 season, 3 years after the formation of the QFA. Similarly, a second division was also created during this time. For many years, there was no promotion or relegation system. Al-Maref, a club representing the Ministry of Education, was dissolved in 1966-67 by decision of the QFA and its players distributed to other clubs.

First official season 
In 1972–73, the first official season was played. Al Esteqlal, now known as Qatar SC, won the first championship.

The first time there was a playoff for the championship was in 1980, between Al Sadd and Al Arabi. Al Sadd won the match 1–0.

Although a second division had been in place for some time, there was no relegation or promotion system. However, in 1981, such a system was put in place for the first time. Five clubs participated in the second division that year.

In 1984–85, there was no relegation or promotion due to a lack of players as members of the Qatar national football team were preparing for the qualification rounds of the 1986 FIFA World Cup.

In 1994, for one season, the QFA launched a new system where matches ending in draws would end in a penalty shoot-out to determine the winner. This was put in place in an effort to improve attendance.

Three second division clubs were dissolved in the 1990 season: Al Nasr, Al Tadamon, and Al Nahda. Many of their players were distributed to first division clubs and became prominent players in Qatari football history, such as Fahad Al Kuwari, Ahmed Al Kuwari and Hamad Al Khalifa. After the dissolution of these clubs, there was no longer any relegation or promotion for five years. In 1995/96, the second division was brought back with five clubs, while there were ten clubs participating in the first division.

Another method the QFA attempted to develop the league was allocating each Q-League club with a sum of $10,000,000 to buy big-name foreign players in order to increase popularity in 2003. It succeeded, and players such as Ronald and Frank de Boer, Romário, Pep Guardiola, Fernando Hierro, Marcel Desailly, Stefan Effenberg, Claudio Caniggia, and Gabriel Batistuta soon appeared in the league.

In addition, in 2004, the Aspire Academy was formed, which provides training facilities to young people in order to improve the footballing standard not only in Qatar, but internationally. Many notable players have graduated from the academy, including Abdelkarim Hassan, Saad Al Sheeb, and Ibrahim Majid.

Changing name to Qatar Stars League 
In 2009, no clubs were relegated from the top division. Due to the recent formation of Lekhwiya and El Jaish, this meant that the second division would lose two clubs while two more clubs would enter the first division, bringing the total number of clubs in the first division to 12, and the second division to 6. As part of the expansion campaign, the "Q-League" changed its name to what it is currently known as, "Qatar Stars League", and inaugurated a new domestic cup, the "Qatari Stars Cup".

Clubs

Champions

2022–23 season

Total titles won by region

Media coverage

Qatar 
In 2012, Alkass Sports signed a deal to have the rights to broadcast Stars League in English. beIN Sports also bought rights to broadcast Stars League.

Post-season awards
An award system was developed in 2006 in which the best player and coach of the footballing season are selected by a panel of journalists. Each award winner receives $100,000. There are also awards for youth players and club staff.

Top goalscorers
Source:

By player

All-time top scorers

See also
Football in Qatar
List of Qatari football transfers summer 2012
 Qatar national football team

References

External links
 QSL Official website 
 QFA Official website 
 Qatar Stars League - worldfootball.net (multilingual)
 Qatar Stars League - goal.com
 Qatar Stars League - Hailoosport.com (Arabic)
 Qatar Stars League - Hailoosport.com
 Qatari Football on Twitter

 
1
Top level football leagues in Asia
Sports leagues established in 1963